"Barrel of a Gun" is a song by English electronic music band Depeche Mode, released as the first single from their ninth studio album, Ultra (1997), on 3 February 1997. The song reached number one in the Czech Republic, Hungary, Spain and Sweden while reaching the top 10 in several other countries, including Finland, Germany, Norway and the United Kingdom. In North America, the song reached number 47 on the US Billboard Hot 100 and number five on the Canadian RPM Alternative 30.

Song meaning
"It's about understanding what you're about and realising that you don't necessarily fit into somebody else's scheme of things," said keyboardist Martin Gore. Singer Dave Gahan, who was weakened from his battle with substance abuse at the time, added, "The song sums up the way I was treating myself and everybody around me. That's what life had in store for me every day. It's a really powerful statement. When you're in that kind of row, the last thing on your mind is dying."

Critical reception
Larry Flick from Billboard wrote, "One of the true pioneering acts of electro-pop ends a lengthy break from the airwaves with a thoroughly satisfying if often caustic blend of techno synths and metallic guitars. Singer Dave Gahan has a field day digging into Martin Gore's typically heavy lyrics, comfortably swerving back and forth between hypnotic lethargy to white-knuckled intensity. Producer Tim Simenon wisely underlines the track with the kind of hip-hop motion needed to crack the pop market, while carefully weaving the instrumentation so that rockers and clubheads alike can happily jam on this one—and they will." 

Dominic Pride from Music & Media noted that Depeche Mode "serve up the sombre, industrial sound for which they've become huge in Europe, but with Simenon adding some open space to the production." He added that Gahan's "distorted vocals bring a touch of Nine Inch Nails to the party." A reviewer from Music Week rated the song four out of five, commenting, "After four years away, this atmospheric epic hints at an even darker approach from the 'Mode. As the first taster for their new album, this is a certain smash."

Music video
The music video for the song, shot in Morocco by Anton Corbijn, features Gahan with long hair singing with his eyes closed, with eyeballs drawn on his eyelids to make it seem like they are open.

Track listings
All songs were written by Martin L. Gore.

 UK and US 12-inch single (12BONG25; 0-43828)
A1. "Barrel of a Gun": 5:31
A2. "Barrel of a Gun" (Underworld hard mix): 9:36
B1. "Barrel of a Gun" (3 Phase mix): 5:25
B2. "Barrel of a Gun" (One Inch Punch mix (V2)): 5:29
B3. "Barrel of a Gun" (Underworld soft mix): 6:29

 UK and European CD single (CDBONG25; 74321464902)
 "Barrel of a Gun"
 "Painkiller"
 "Barrel of a Gun" (Underworld soft mix)
 "Barrel of a Gun" (One Inch Punch mix)

 US 7-inch single (7-17409)
A. "Barrel of a Gun" – 5:30
B. "Painkiller" (original mix) – 7:28

 US CD single (2-17409)
 "Barrel of a Gun" – 5:30
 "Barrel of a Gun" (United mix) – 6:34
 "Painkiller" (original mix) – 7:28

 Canadian CD single (CD 43828)
 "Barrel of a Gun" (single version) – 5:29
 "Painkiller" (Plastikman mix) – 8:39
 "Barrel of a Gun" (Underworld soft mix) – 6:27
 "Barrel of a Gun" (One Inch Punch mix) – 5:25
 "Barrel of a Gun" (Underworld hard mix) – 9:36

 Australian CD single (D1560, LCDBONG 25)
 "Barrel of a Gun" (Underworld hard mix)
 "Barrel of a Gun" (United mix)
 "Painkiller" (Plastikman mix)

Credits and personnel
Credits are taken from the Ultra album booklet.

Studios
Recorded at Abbey Road, Eastcote, Westside, Strongroom, RAK (London, England), Electric Lady (New York City), and Larrabee West (Los Angeles)
Mastered at The Exchange (London, England)

Personnel
Martin Gore – writing (as Martin L. Gore)
Dave Clayton – keyboards, keyboard programming
Victor Indrizzo – percussion
Tim Simenon – production, mixing
Q. – mixing, engineering
Kerry Hopwood – programming
Mike Marsh – mastering

Charts

Weekly charts

Year-end charts

Certifications

References

External links
 Single information from the official Depeche Mode web site
 Allmusic review 

1996 songs
1997 singles
Depeche Mode songs
Music videos directed by Anton Corbijn
Mute Records singles
Number-one singles in the Czech Republic
Number-one singles in Hungary
Number-one singles in Spain
Number-one singles in Sweden
Reprise Records singles
Song recordings produced by Bomb the Bass
Songs written by Martin Gore
UK Independent Singles Chart number-one singles